Propeller Island City Lodge is a hotel and art installation in Berlin, Germany designed by artist Lars Storschen and located in the borough of Wilmersdorf. The hotel is known for its eclectic and elaborately themed rooms.

History
In December 1997, German musician and artist Lars Storschen rented out rooms in his Berlin home to supplement his income.  Bored with the idea of a traditional guest room, Storschen decided to create four uniquely themed rooms for his guests: the Symbol room, the Orange room, the Castle room, and the Mirrors room. He named the hotel Propeller Island City Lodge, based on the pseudonym he had adapted from the Jules Verne novel of the same name.

As the hotel's popularity grew, Strochen purchased vacant space in the same building and in 1998 began designing 27 new guest rooms. Floors 1 and 2 were opened in 2001, and the hotel's 3rd floor was completed in August 2002. As of 2013, the hotel consists of thirty rooms, including an art gallery, reception area, and Frühstücksraum (breakfast room).

Rooms
Each room is considered more a work of art than a practical living space, and as such many are furnished with damageable or fragile materials. Guests are provided with a manual outlining specific rules for the care of their room's decorative touches. The rooms are not equipped with television or commercial radio, but there is a sound system featuring soundscapes recorded by Strochen. Since the opening of the hotel, some of the rooms have been redecorated.

List of Rooms
4 beams - Bed is suspended by ropes and surrounded by four large wooden posts
Blue room - Room draped completely in blue with mirrored stainless steel "sails" on the walls
Castle - Fortress-styled furnishings and abstract architecture painted on the walls 
Electric Wallpapers - Decorated with computer art; includes a kitchen
Flying Bed - Slanted floor that creates an illusion of a flying bed
Forest - Styled after a cabin; bed is built atop a stack of logs
Freedom - Designed as a prison cell with an escape hole "broken" through a wall
Gallery - Features a circular bed that can be rotated with a pedal to change view of the room
Glas House - Constructed with stained glass and antique windows
Grandma's - Antique decor, bathroom concealed in room's wardrobe
Gruft - Goth-inspired room with coffin beds and a labyrinth underneath
Hol(l)y-Wood - Transparent red glass walls and ladder-accessible beds
Landscapes - Wave-shaped walls and an octagonal ceiling
Medi-Terra - Styled after a Mediterranean village
Mirror room - Walls and ceiling are completely covered in mirrors
Museum - Contains artifacts from history of the City Lodge
Nightlight - Bronze and gold walls with a giant plastic bag bathtub
Nudes - Decorated with nude art
Orange - Room decorated completely in orange
Padded Cell - Modeled after a padded room in a psychiatric hospital
Space-Cube - Blue industrial decor; bed can be separated by crank-operated illuminated barrier
Speicher - Beam construction similar to a barn with a loft
Symbols - Tiled floor to ceiling with symbols and glyphs 
The Table - Features raised circular bed in middle of the room
Tempel - Styled after an Asian temple with a stepped bed
Therapy - Features a variety of colored lights that can illuminate the room in different ways
Two Lions - Design similar to a zoo or circus train; contains two elevated cages that can be used as beds
Upside Down - Furniture is fixed upside-down on the ceiling; beds are hidden under the floor
Wrapped - Tube-shaped room reminiscent of a mine shaft with terraced beds

See also
List of hotels in Germany

External links
Propeller Island City Lodge website
Propeller Island City Lodge photos
main website of latimera 
schnipseldienst of latimera

References

Art museums and galleries in Berlin
Buildings and structures in Charlottenburg-Wilmersdorf
Eclectic architecture
Hotels established in 1997
Hotels in Berlin
Tourist attractions in Berlin